Aloys Feldmann (April 25, 1897 – October 9, 1965) was a German politician of the Christian Democratic Union (CDU) and former member of the German Bundestag.

Life 
Feldmann was one of the co-founders of the CDU Westfalen-Lippe in 1946/47. He was a member of the state parliament of North Rhine-Westphalia from 1946 to 1950. He was a member of the German Bundestag from its first election in 1949 to 1957 as a member of parliament directly elected to the parliament of the constituency of Lippstadt-Brilon.

Literature

References

1897 births
1965 deaths
Members of the Bundestag for North Rhine-Westphalia
Members of the Bundestag 1953–1957
Members of the Bundestag 1949–1953
Members of the Bundestag for the Christian Democratic Union of Germany
Members of the Landtag of North Rhine-Westphalia